Nora Woodson Ulreich (1899 – October 26, 1950), known professionally as Nura, was an American artist, muralist, children's book author and illustrator.

Early life and education 
Ulreich was born in Kansas City, Missouri. Her father was a Confederate veteran who had settled in Kansas City. She grew up there, ultimately attending the Kansas City Art Institute.

Career 
A multidisciplinary artist, Ulreich was also an author, painter, muralist, textile artist and illustrator. She collaborated frequently with her husband Edward Buk Ulreich.

Ulreich's work is included in the permanent collections of the San Diego Museum of Art, the Smithsonian American Art Museum, the Walker Art Center and the David Winton Bell Gallery at Brown University.

Personal life 
Ulreich was married to Hungarian-born artist Edward Buk Ulreich.

Books 
 Stories (1932)
 The Buttermilk Tree (1934)
 Nura's Garden of Betty & Booth (1935)
 The Silver Bridge (1937)
 Nura's Children Go Visiting (1943)
 All Aboard, We Are Off (1944)
 The Mitty Children Fix Things (1946)
 The Kitten Who Listened (1950)

References

External links 

 images of Ulreich's art on ArtNet

1899 births
1950 deaths
Kansas City Art Institute alumni
American children's book illustrators
American women illustrators
20th-century American women artists
American textile artists
20th-century women textile artists
20th-century textile artists